Photographs as Memories is the debut studio album by English band Eyeless in Gaza. It was released on 30 January 1981, through record label Cherry Red.

Track listing

Reception 

Photograps as Memories received mixed reviews on its release, from  “An interesting, invigorating listen” (Melody Maker) to “Stinkingly awful” (Record Mirror). Des Moines in Sounds noted "a lot of flaws" and Martyn Bates' "extremely challenging voice", but acknowledged that "'From A to B’, ‘Speech Rapid Fire’ and ‘No Noise’ are three representations of how Becker (£200 Wasp synthesiser, voice, percussion, violin, stylophone, ‘treated tapes’) and Bates (voice, electric guitar, plastic organ, soprano sax) at full flow achieve their thoroughly magic melodies", and that "Becker’s uncanny flair for compelling succinct synthesiser hook lines is the conspicuous characteristic, but Bates’ imperiously evocative vocal is a factor just as crucial." While dismissing "John of Patmos" and "In Your Painting" as "rubbish", the reviewer acknowledged that "the highspots of the album are truly staggering". 

Retrospectively, AllMusic described the album's "non-style-over-substance sense of work ethic" as "frustrating". Trouser Press described it as a "better-than-decent stab at hook-filled spareness".

Personnel 

 Pete Becker – unspecified instrumentation, vocals, production
 Martyn Bates – unspecified instrumentation, vocals, production

 Technical

 John Rivers – engineering
 Jim Jag – sleeve artwork

References

External links 

 

1981 debut albums
Eyeless in Gaza albums
Cherry Red Records albums